Tournan is the name of several communes of France:

 Tournan, Gers, in the Gers department
 Tournan-en-Brie, in the Seine-et-Marne department

See also 
 Tournans, in the Doubs department